Osvaldo "Ozzie" Canseco Capas (born July 2, 1964) is a Cuban-American former professional baseball player. He is the identical twin brother of former Major League Baseball player José Canseco.

He was manager for the Brownsville Charros of the United League before the league's dissolution. He was previously the pitching and hitting coach for the Yuma Scorpions of the independent North American League and the manager of the Edinburg Roadrunners.

Playing career 
In 1991, he played in Japan for the Kintetsu Buffaloes.

Canseco was drafted as a pitcher by the New York Yankees in the second round of the 1983 Major League Baseball draft. In stark contrast to the prolific, power hitting career of his twin brother, Ozzie never hit a major league home run.

Canseco currently holds the Atlantic League single season home run record with 48, which he achieved while playing for the Newark Bears in 2000. (This was more home runs than his brother ever hit in a season.) After the season ended Canseco was named the league's MVP. Later he played one season in the Northern League. In 1991, Canseco signed a one-year contract with the Kintetsu Buffaloes of the Japanese Pacific League. However, due to an injury, Ozzie would never play a game with the Buffaloes.

Yuma Scorpions 
On April 11, 2011, it was announced that Ozzie and his brother would play for the Yuma Scorpions of the North American League. In addition to playing, Ozzie would be the bench coach and Jose would manage the team. Ozzie played 12 games with 8 hits and 12 RBIs. His season batting average was .258.

Other activities 
Canseco appeared on an episode of VH1's The Surreal Life (Season 5) as a José Canseco impersonator. At the end of the program, it was revealed that he was José's twin brother. He has also reportedly appeared at baseball card shows and book signings passing himself off as his brother.

As manager of the Brownsville Charros in the United League, Ozzie pulled his team off the field with a 2–1 lead giving the RGV Whitewings a win.

Legal troubles 
In 2002, Canseco pleaded guilty to charges stemming from a nightclub fight on October 31, 2001. He and his brother Jose got into a fight with two California tourists at a Miami Beach nightclub that left one man with a broken nose and another needing 20 stitches in his lip; Canseco was charged with two counts of aggravated battery. The brothers received probation and community service – Ozzie was sentenced to 18 months' probation, 200 hours of community service and anger management classes.

In 2003, Canseco was sentenced to four months in jail for possessing an illegal anabolic steroid and driving with a suspended license.

References

External links

1964 births
Living people
American expatriate baseball players in Japan
American expatriate baseball players in Mexico
American sportspeople of Cuban descent
Baseball players from Florida
Brownsville Charros players
Cuban emigrants to the United States
Duluth-Superior Dukes players
Edinburg Roadrunners players
Fargo-Moorhead RedHawks players
Fort Lauderdale Yankees players
Ganaderos de Tabasco players
Greensboro Hornets players
Gulf Coast Yankees players
Huntsville Stars players
Identical twins
Kintetsu Buffaloes players
Laredo Broncos players
Louisville Redbirds players
Lotte Giants players
Madison Muskies players
Major League Baseball left fielders
Major League Baseball players from Cuba
Cuban expatriate baseball players in the United States
Major League Baseball right fielders
Minor league baseball managers
New Orleans Zephyrs players
Newark Bears players
Oakland Athletics players
Oneonta Yankees players
People convicted of battery
Baseball players from Havana
St. Louis Cardinals players
Sultanes de Monterrey players
American twins
Twin sportspeople
Yuma Scorpions players
Cuban expatriate baseball players in Japan
Cuban expatriate baseball players in Mexico